Shigeru Izumiya (泉谷 しげる Izumiya Shigeru, born May 11, 1948 in Aomori, raised in Meguro, Tokyo) is a Japanese poet, folk singer, actor, tarento. He established the record company For Life Records with Takuro Yoshida, Yosui Inoue, and Hitoshi Komuro in 1975. He also directed the 1986 film Death Powder (Desu Paudā).

Between August 1995 and March 1996, Izumiya co-hosted the Satellaview-based weekly SoundLink Magazine, with Ayumi Hamasaki.

Discography

Singles 
1970s
 (1971)
 (1972)
 (1973)
 (1974)
 (1975)
 (1976)
 (1977)
 (1977)
 (1978)
 (1979)
 (1979)

1980s
 (1980)
 (1981)
 (1982)
 (1983)
UNDER PRICK c/w HAIR STYLE(1984)
 (1987)
 (live, 1988)
 (1988)
 (1989)

1990s
 (1991)
 (1993)
 (1994)
 (1994)
 (1995)
(1995)
 (1998)

2000s
 (2007)

 (2008)

 (2009)

Albums 
1970s
  (1971)
  (1972)
  (1972, CD rereleased in 2006)
  (1973)
  (1974)
 (1975)
  (1976)
  (1976)
  (1977)
  (1978)
  (1979)

1980s
  (1980)
 NEWS (1982)
 39°8´ (1983)
 REAL TIME (1984)
 ELEVATOR (1984)
 SCAR PEOPLE (1986)
  (1988)
 EARLY TIME (1988)
 HOWLING LIVE (1988)
 IZUMIYA SELF COVERS (1988)
  (1989)

1990s
  (1991)
  (1991)
  (1991)
  (1992)
 HOT TYPHOON FROM　EAST (1992)
 WILD BLOOD (1993)
  (1993)
  (1993)
  (1994)
  (1995)
  (1996)
  (1997)
  (1998)
  (1998)
  (1999)
  (1999)

2000s
 IRA (2000)
  (2001)
 R-15 (2002)
  (2007, Limited Edition DVD Box set)
  (2008)
   (2008)
  (2008)
  (2008)

Filmography

Film
Eijanaika (1981)
Death Powder (1986)
Aitsu ni Koishite (1987)
Pom Poko (1994), Gonta (voice)
Doraemon: Nobita in the Wan-Nyan Spacetime Odyssey (2004) (voice)
Godzilla: Final Wars (2004)
Ode to Joy (2006)
Black Widow Business (2016)
Fukushima 50 (2020)
A Morning of Farewell (2021)
Tsuyukusa (2022)
Dr. Coto's Clinic 2022 (2022), Shigeo Ando

Television
Dr. Coto's Clinic (2003–06), Shigeo Ando

References

External links 
IZ Japanese official site
.
.

1948 births
Living people
People from Aomori (city)
Japanese male musicians
Japanese male actors
Musicians from Aomori Prefecture
Musicians from Tokyo